Graffignana is a comune (municipality) in the Province of Lodi in the Italian region Lombardy, located about  southeast of Milan and about  south of Lodi.

Graffignana borders the following municipalities: Sant'Angelo Lodigiano, Villanova del Sillaro, Borghetto Lodigiano, San Colombano al Lambro, Miradolo Terme.

People 

 Luigi Carlo Borromeo, (1893–1975), bishop of Pesaro

References

External links
Official website

Cities and towns in Lombardy